The Boston Library Consortium (BLC) is a library consortium based in the Boston area with 23 member institutions across New England.

Membership 

The Boston Library Consortium is an academic consortium of twenty-three institutions: sixteen in Massachusetts, three in Connecticut, one in New Hampshire, one in Rhode Island, and one in Vermont. The Internet Archive is an affiliate member. Member institutions represent a mix of liberal arts colleges, research universities, public and private institutions, and special libraries. New members may join the BLC if they are based in the northeastern United States and their application is approved by a two-thirds vote of the board of directors. The BLC is funded through membership assessments.

Members

Current members include the following institutions:

 Bentley University
 Boston College
 Boston Public Library
 Boston University
 Brandeis University
 Marine Biological Laboratory and Woods Hole Oceanographic Institution
 Northeastern University
 State Library of Massachusetts
 Tufts University
 University of Connecticut
 University of Hartford
 University of Massachusetts Amherst
 University of Massachusetts Boston
 University of Massachusetts Dartmouth
 University of Massachusetts Lowell
 University of Massachusetts Medical School
 University of New Hampshire
 University of Rhode Island
 University of Vermont
 Wellesley College
 Wesleyan University
 Williams College

History

The BLC was founded in 1970 and officially incorporated in 1977, consisting originally of five institutions. It had grown to twelve institutions by 1993, seventeen by 2014, and nineteen by 2019. Former members include Brown University and Massachusetts Institute of Technology (MIT). The BLC is administered by an Executive Director and governed by a board of directors. Each member institution of the BLC is represented on the Board by the chief librarian of its principal library. Per its bylaws, the BLC's purpose is "to share human and information resources so that the collective strengths support and advance the research and learning of the members’ constituents."

Activities 
Major BLC areas of activity include resource sharing and professional development. The BLC runs a "BLC Leads" program to foster leadership development among member library staff, a reciprocal borrowing agreement through which faculty and other patrons affiliated with any member library can borrow materials for free from other member libraries, a shared virtual catalog and rapid delivery of materials between libraries to fulfill patron requests, cooperative purchasing of scholarly resources, and hosting of communities of interest to foster discussion and collaboration among member libraries. Past activities included cooperative collecting and sharing of materials in select subject areas, such as women's studies.

In 2007, the BLC partnered with the Open Content Alliance (OCA) to digitize BLC member libraries' out-of-copyright print collections and make them freely available online via the Internet Archive. To fund the effort, the BLC pledged more than $845,000 over two years. This partnership made the BLC the first large-scale consortium to embark on a self-funded digitization project with the OCA.

In 2014, the BLC, along with the Orbis Cascade Alliance and other groups, pushed back against a publisher price increase on e-books, which they feared would negatively impact academic library budgets.

Since 2014, the BLC has administered the Eastern Academic Scholars' Trust (EAST), a collective collections initiative across sixty-five academic libraries throughout the eastern United States. EAST member libraries have committed to retaining over six million volumes. EAST's goal is "preserving the print scholarly record and ensuring its availability for scholars, students and faculty." Under BLC auspices, the EAST initiative received startup grants totaling $1.5 million from the Andrew W. Mellon Foundation and the Davis Educational Foundation in 2014–2015. As of 2018, EAST is self-supporting through institutional membership fees.

References

External links
 
Eastern Academic Scholars' Trust

Organizations established in 1970
Library consortia in Massachusetts
Library consortia in Connecticut
Library consortia in New Hampshire
Library consortia in Rhode Island
Library consortia in Vermont
Library consortia with members in multiple states
Organizations based in Boston
Cooperatives in the United States